The  mixed pairs BC4 boccia event at the 2016 Summer Paralympics was contested from 13 September to 16 September at Sambodromo in Rio de Janeiro. 8 teams of competitors took part....
The event structure was amended from the 2012 event, with pool stages added. The top two teams from each of two pools then entered into a quarterfinal single-elimination stage, with the losing semifinalists playing off for bronze.

Elimination stages

Pool stages

Pool A

Pool B

References

Pairs BC4